Uddingston East railway station served the town of Uddingston in South Lanarkshire on the Glasgow, Bothwell, Hamilton and Coatbridge Railway between Shettleston and Hamilton.

History
Uddingston was opened on 1 April 1878 on the Glasgow, Bothwell, Hamilton and Coatbridge Railway. It was closed as a wartime economy measure between 1917 and 1919. Following nationalisation the station was renamed as Uddingston East to avoid confusion with the nearby Clydesdale Junction Railway station of the same name on 28 February 1953. Uddingston East was closed two years later on 4 July 1955. The line closed to freight traffic on 4 October 1964.

Services

References

Notes

Sources
 
 
 

Disused railway stations in South Lanarkshire
Former North British Railway stations
Railway stations in Great Britain opened in 1878
Railway stations in Great Britain closed in 1917
Railway stations in Great Britain opened in 1919
Railway stations in Great Britain closed in 1955
Bothwell and Uddingston